is a railway station on the Yamanote Line in Toshima, Tokyo, Japan, operated by the East Japan Railway Company (JR East).

Lines
Mejiro Station is served by the circular Yamanote Line. It is one of only two stations on the Yamanote Line that does not provide a direct connection to any other line, the other being Shin-Ōkubo Station.

Station layout
Mejiro Station has one island platform serving two tracks. The station building is located above the tracks, and accessibility to and from the platforms is provided by escalators as well as lifts. There are several small shops and a bakery/cafe within the station.

Platform edge doors were installed and brought into use from 9 November 2013.

Platforms

History
The station opened on 16 March 1885.

Station numbering was introduced in 2016 with Mejiro being assigned station number JY14.

Passenger statistics
In fiscal 2012, the station was used by an average of 37,684 passengers daily (boarding passengers only). The passenger figures for previous years are as shown below.

Surrounding area
Mejiro is one of the Yamanote Line's smaller stations, situated between the bustling Ikebukuro and the relatively quiet Takadanobaba.

Mejiro Station has only a single exit. The ticket gate emerges onto Mejiro-dori with the co-ed campus of Gakushuin University and the Mejiro Elementary School to the right, and to the left a busy row of shops and restaurants. Just off Mejiro-dori, the wealthy area becomes residential and quite peaceful. The streets to the west, away from the Yamanote loop, feature a mix of typical apartment buildings spanning a few decades, and some very opulent designer houses with luxury vehicles in their garages.

By looking straight ahead from Mejiro Station's main exit, one can see well into the distance toward Ikebukuro's monument-like garbage processing center and the towering Sunshine 60 building.

When inside Mejiro Station, if you stand at the southernmost part, you can see Takadanobaba Station.

See also

 List of railway stations in Japan
 Transportation in Greater Tokyo

References

External links

 JR East station information 

Railway stations in Tokyo
Railway stations in Japan opened in 1885
Yamanote Line
Stations of East Japan Railway Company